Musa Tarabin (born 16 August 1997) is an Israeli footballer who plays for Markaz Balata as a forward.

External links
 
 

1997 births
Living people
Israeli footballers
Hapoel Be'er Sheva F.C. players
Hapoel Bnei Lod F.C. players
Hapoel Jerusalem F.C. players
Hapoel Iksal F.C. players
Markaz Balata players
Liga Leumit players
Footballers from Shaqib al-Salam
Association football forwards
Israeli people of Egyptian descent